Plagyostila is a genus of minute sea snails, marine gastropod mollusks or micromollusks in the family Rissoidae.

Species
Species within the genus Plagyostila include:

 Plagyostila asturiana Fischer P. in de Folin, 1872
 Plagyostila senegalensis Rolán & Pelorce, 2002

References

Rissoidae